Pam Marsh (born November 4, 1954) is an American Democratic politician currently serving in the Oregon House of Representatives. She represents the 5th district, which covers southern Jackson County, including the city of Ashland.

Career
Marsh attended the University of California, Berkeley from 1973 until 1975, and graduated from Southern Oregon University in 2005. She lived in Palo Alto, California, where she served as field representative for state assemblymember Byron Sher and as city planning commissioner from 1985 until 1993, before moving to Ashland in 1994.

Marsh served as a member of the Ashland Charter Review Commission from 2004 until 2006, and as chair of the Ashland City Planning Commission from 2006 until 2012. She was appointed to the City Council in December 2012, in order to fill a vacancy.

In February 2016, Marsh declared her candidacy for the Oregon House seat vacated by the retiring Peter J. Buckley. She defeated Republican Steven Richie in the general election with 63% of the vote.

Personal life
Marsh and her husband, Diarmuid McGuire, have four children: Kerry, Meghan, Padraic, and Molly. She is religiously unaffiliated.

References

External links
 Campaign website
 Legislative website

1954 births
Living people
Democratic Party members of the Oregon House of Representatives
Oregon city council members
County commissioners in Oregon
School board members in Oregon
Politicians from Ashland, Oregon
People from Palo Alto, California
Politicians from St. Louis
21st-century American politicians
21st-century American women politicians
Women state legislators in Oregon
University of California, Berkeley alumni
Southern Oregon University alumni
Women city councillors in Oregon